George Withers (15 June 1843 – 31 March 1908) was an Australian politician.

He was born in Parramatta, the son of draper Edwin Augustus Withers. He was apprenticed to a builder at the age of sixteen, and became a partner in the List Brothers firm in 1867. On 18 April 1870 he married Mary Ann Callaghan, with whom he had seven children. In 1880 he was elected to the New South Wales Legislative Assembly for South Sydney. Re-elected in 1882, he was defeated in 1885 but returned in 1887; he retired in 1889. During this period he retired from building and became a land auctioneer. After leaving politics he moved to Perth, where he died in 1908.

References

 

1843 births
1908 deaths
Members of the New South Wales Legislative Assembly
Free Trade Party politicians
19th-century Australian politicians